The 1995 Gent–Wevelgem was the 57th edition of the Gent–Wevelgem cycle race and was held on 5 April 1995. The race started in Ghent and finished in Wevelgem. The race was won by Lars Michaelsen of the Festina team.

General classification

References

Gent–Wevelgem
1995 in road cycling
1995 in Belgian sport